Hugh Laing (6 June 191110 May 1988) was one of the most significant dramatic ballet dancers of the 20th-century. He danced with Marie Rambert's Ballet Club and New York City Ballet. He was the partner of choreographer Antony Tudor.

Biography 
Hugh Laing was born in Barbados in the then British West Indies. He moved to London in 1931 to study art, but soon became interested in ballet. After taking ballet classes with Marie Rambert, Margaret Craske and Olga Preobrajenska, he joined Miss Rambert's experimental Ballet Club in 1933, and it was there that he met Antony Tudor.

He remained Tudor's artistic collaborator and companion until the choreographer's death in 1987. For the Ballet Club, Tudor created roles for Laing in The Planets, The Descent of Hebe, Jardin aux Lilas and Dark Elegies.

In 1938, Laing became a member of Tudor's London Ballet, a short-lived troupe for which he danced in Tudor's Gala Performance and Judgment of Paris.

Hugh Laing accompanied Tudor to New York in 1939 to participate in the first season of Ballet Theater, as American Ballet Theatre was originally known. Just as Tudor soon was recognised as a great choreographer, so Laing was hailed as one of the company's finest artists.

At Ballet Theater, Tudor choreographed several of the roles for which Laing was famous - the handsome, but corrupt, Young Man from the House Opposite in Pillar of Fire (1942), Romeo in Romeo and Juliet (1943), a sophisticated gentleman in Dim Lustre (also 1943) and a murderer in Undertow (1945). He was also admired for his portrayals of the gypsy lover in Léonide Massine's Aleko, a neurotic young man in Jerome Robbins' Facsimile, Albrecht in Giselle and the title role of Petrushka.

He danced with the New York City Ballet from 1950 to 1952, appearing in a revival of Jardin aux Lilas and in such new works by Tudor as The Lady of the Camellias (1951) and La Gloire (1952). In addition, he won praise in the title role of George Balanchine's Prodigal Son and Robbins's Age of Anxiety. He later made guest appearances with Ballet Theater, then embarked upon a new career as a commercial photographer in New York continuing to assist Tudor with restagings of his ballets.

Laing appeared as the villain Harry Beaton in the film version of the musical Brigadoon (1954).

Known for his good looks and the intensity of his stage presence, Laing was never considered a great technician, yet his powers of characterisation and his sense of theatrical timing were considered remarkable. His profile as a significant dancer of his era was almost certainly enhanced by Tudor's choreographing to his undoubted strengths and Laing is generally regarded as one of the finest dramatic dancers of 20th-century ballet.

Personal life
Laing's longtime relationship with Tudor was briefly interrupted when Laing married the American ballerina Diana Adams in 1947. Laing and Adams were divorced in 1953.

Death
Hugh Laing died of cancer, aged 77, in New York City in 1988.

Filmography

External links
Hugh Laing and Antony Tudor papers, 1911-1988 Jerome Robbins Dance Division, New York Public Library.
1951 video of Laing and Nora Kaye in The Gods Go a'Begging

References

1911 births
1988 deaths
British male ballet dancers
LGBT dancers
Barbadian LGBT people
Bisexual men
20th-century LGBT people
Deaths from cancer in New York (state)
Barbadian emigrants to the United States